Roland Seitz (born 1 October 1964) is a German former football player who was most recently the manager of VfR Aalen. Before that he was the coach of SV Elversberg, where he also had the role as the sporting director.

References

External links

1964 births
Living people
German footballers
Association football forwards
Bundesliga players
2. Bundesliga players
SpVgg Unterhaching players
FC Augsburg players
FC Amberg players
SpVgg Greuther Fürth players
MSV Duisburg players
FC 08 Homburg players
SSV Jahn Regensburg players
German football managers
3. Liga managers
SV Eintracht Trier 05 managers
SC Paderborn 07 managers
FC Erzgebirge Aue managers
SSV Reutlingen 05 managers
SV Elversberg managers
VfR Aalen managers